was a train station in Urausu, Kabato District, Hokkaidō, Japan.

Lines
The station was served by the Sassho Line.

Station layout
The station had a side platform serving one track. The unmanned station building was located beside the platform.

History
The station opened on 10 October 1934.

In December 2018, it was announced that the station would be closed on May 7, 2020, along with the rest of the non-electrified section of the Sasshō Line. The station closed earlier on April 17, 2020, due to the COVID-19 pandemic.

Adjacent stations

References

Stations of Hokkaido Railway Company
Railway stations in Hokkaido Prefecture
Railway stations in Japan opened in 1934
Railway stations closed in 2020